Thembinkosi Lorch (born 22 July 1993) is a South African professional soccer player who plays as an attacking midfielder for Orlando Pirates and the South African national team. He was named the South African Player of the Season and Players' Player of the Season in 2019.'

Career
Thembinkosi Lorch nicknamed "Nyoso" started his career at Maluti FET College FC and after a game against Jomo Cosmos, got a call from Screamer Tshabalala who told him that Pirates was interested in him. His first PSL game was against Free State Stars, playing for Chippa United on loan from Orlando Pirates. DJ Maphorisa and Kabza De Small's 2019 song, titled Lorch, was inspired by and named after him.

Personal life
In the early morning of 7 September 2020, Lorch was arrested for allegedly assaulting his then-girlfriend, Nokuphiwa Mathithibala. This came after she had opened up a case of assault against him at Midrand Police station indicating that Lorch had strangled her after she had asked about his whereabouts. In January 2021, the assault case was provisionally withdrawn with the prosecutor instructing police to investigate further.

Lorch briefly dated actress Natasha Thahane from June to September 2021.

Career statistics

Scores and results list South Africa's goal tally first, score column indicates score after each Lorch goal.

References

External links

1993 births
Living people
Association football forwards
South African soccer players
National First Division players
Chippa United F.C. players
South African Premier Division players
2019 Africa Cup of Nations players
South Africa international soccer players